This is a list of defunct National Collegiate Athletic Association (NCAA) men's college basketball conferences in the United States. The NCAA is divided into three divisions, based on school size and enrollment. Each division is made up of several conferences for regional league play. Over time, these conferences will disband due to lack of teams, joining of their teams to other conferences, lack of budget, merging to another conference, stopped sponsoring basketball or simply a command from the NCAA.

College basketball was started in 1895 with its first ever game between Hamline and Minnesota. It was later developed in 1896 with its first game in a five player format with Chicago against Iowa. Almost all schools are independent at that time until since the formation of the Intercollegiate Athletic Association of the United States (now NCAA) in 1906. But even before the development, conferences began to form, such as the Intercollegiate Conference of Faculty Representatives (now Big Ten Conference) in 1896 which is the oldest active conference in the NCAA, and the Eastern Intercollegiate Basketball League formed in 1901, which was folded into the Ivy League in 1955.

As of July 2019, there are 30 defunct conferences in total: 20 conferences in Division I, six in Division II and four in Division III. The defunct conference that was active for the shortest period is the Northern California Conference, formed in 1937 and ended in 1939; the longest-lived defunct conference is the West Virginia Intercollegiate Athletic Conference (WVIAC), which has a span of 89 years (1924 to 2013). The most recent conference to dissolve is the Division II Heartland Conference, which disbanded at the end of the 2018–19 school year, with seven of its nine members joining the Lone Star Conference and the other two moving to the Mid-America Intercollegiate Athletics Association.

Division I

Notes

Division II

Division III

See also

List of defunct college football conferences

References

Lists of defunct sports organizations